Harry Ralph Gairey (18981993) was a Jamaican-born Black Canadian community leader and activist who worked as a railroad porter for much of his life.

Gairey moved to Toronto from Cuba in 1914.  He worked for the Grand Trunk Railway as a dishwasher, cook and waiter until the early 1930s, when Black waiters were laid off in the competition for remaining jobs resulting from the railway's absorption into the operations of Canadian National.  In 1936, to support his young family, Gairey returned to railway work, this time for Canadian Pacific as a porter.  The poor working conditions and lack of job security led Gairey, along with other porters including Stanley G. Grizzle, to form a local chapter of the Brotherhood of Sleeping Car Porters labour union in the 1940s.  Gairey was promoted to the position of porter instructor in the late 1940s.

In November 1945 Gairey's teenage son, Harry Gairey Jr., was refused entry to the Icelandia indoor skating rink on racial grounds. The incident and resulting protests by students received substantial news coverage in Toronto. Gairey appealed to his alderman and the city council, spurring the creation of Toronto's first anti-discrimination ordinance in 1947.  Gairey argued that since military conscription was extended to all young Canadian men, regardless of race, the rights of every citizen should be the same as well.

Gairey's civil rights activism made him a leader in Toronto's Black community and effected change at a national level.  Inspired by the work of Marcus Garvey, he was a charter member of the Toronto branch of the Universal Negro Improvement Association and helped to form the Negro Citizenship Association to advocate for changes to Canada's discriminatory immigration laws.  

In an obituary, Gairey was lauded for his leadership and his efforts to combat racial discrimination.

Awards
Harry Gairey received the Jamaican Order of Distinction in 1977 in recognition of his long service to the Caribbean communities of Toronto.   He was awarded the Order of Canada in 1986 and the Order of Ontario in 1987, its inaugural year.  The outdoor skating rink in Alexandra Park, Toronto, was named in Gairey's honour in 1996.

References

Canadian trade unionists
Canadian human rights activists

Members of the Order of Ontario
Members of the Order of Canada
Black Canadian activists
1898 births
1993 deaths
Emigrants from British Jamaica to Canada